Elassogaster is a genus of scavenger flies (Diptera) belonging to the family Platystomatidae. They are native to warm regions of Africa, Madagascar, Asia and Australia.

They have rounded heads with red eyes, a shiny green thorax and a dark stigma on the wing tips. Adults frequent the vicinity of dung or carcasses, where they walk while constantly waving their wings. The larvae develop in dung.

Species
E. aerea Hendel, 1914
E. anteapicalis Hendel, 1914
E. arcuata Hendel, 1914
E. brachialis (Rondani, 1873)
E. calida (Wiedemann, 1830)
E. didyma (Osten Sacken, 1881)
E. didymoides Hendel, 1914
E. flavipes (Schiner, 1868)
E. floresana Hennig, 1941
E. hilgendorfi Enderlein, 1924
E. hyalipennis Malloch, 1931
E. immaculata (Macquart, 1843)
E. inflexus (Fabricius, 1805)
E. linearis (Walker, 1849)
E. metallica Bigot, 1860
E. nigripes Malloch, 1940
E. potens Frey, 1930
E. pulla Hendel, 1914
E. quadrimaculata Hendel, 1914
E. rutila (Hendel, 1914)
E. sangiensis Meijere, 1916
E. signatipes (Walker, 1860)
E. simplex Frey, 1930
E. sordida (Walker, 1861)
E. vanderwulpi Hendel, 1914

References

External links

Diptera of Africa
Diptera of Asia
Platystomatidae
Schizophora genera
Taxa named by Jacques-Marie-Frangile Bigot